Patrick Joseph Moore (born April 28, 1970) is an American professional golfer.

Career
Moore was born in Austin, Minnesota. He was a member of the PGA Tour. He has struggled with injuries for most of his career. He won three Buy.com Tour events in 2002 which gave him an immediate promotion to the PGA Tour.

Moore has struggled with back injuries since 2003 and has played in very few tournaments since 2004, although he maintained a PGA Tour card through a medical extension through the 2014 season.

Professional wins (3)

Buy.com Tour wins (3)

*Note: The 2002 Buy.com Tour Championship was shortened to 54 holes due to rain.

See also
2002 Buy.com Tour graduates

External links

American male golfers
North Carolina Tar Heels men's golfers
PGA Tour golfers
Korn Ferry Tour graduates
Golfers from Minnesota
Golfers from Arizona
People from Austin, Minnesota
Sportspeople from Mesa, Arizona
1970 births
Living people